This is a list of American television-related events in 1965.

Events

Other notable events in 1965 
The New York City market's WOR-TV launches a cable television feed of the station's programming to be distributed nationwide, known as the WOR-TV EMI Service.

Television programs

Debuts

Changes of network affiliation

Ending this year

Television films, specials and miniseries

Networks and services

Network launches

Television stations

Sign-ons

Network affiliation changes

Station closures

Births

Deaths

References

External links 
List of 1965 American television series at IMDb